United National Movement may refer to:

United National Movement (Georgia)
United National Movement (Pakistan)
United National Movement (Saint Kitts-Nevis-Anguilla)